Thomas Scannell (3 June 1925 – 30 November 1993) was an Irish professional footballer.

Club career
Born in Youghal, Ireland, Scannell began his career in England with Essex-based club Tilbury. In November 1949, Scannell signed for Southend United. Scannell's transfer fee, coupled with Tilbury's impressive run to the FA Cup first round in the same year, allowed Tilbury to purchase their Chadfields ground. Whilst at Southend, Scannell made 98 Football League appearances at the club, conceding 148 goals in his first 100 games in all competitions and keeping 31 clean sheets. In 1955, following his time at Southend, Scannell dropped back into non-league, signing for Folkestone.

International career
On 7 March 1954, aged 29, Scannell made a solitary senior appearance for the Republic of Ireland national football team, starting in an experimental line-up that defeated Luxembourg 1–0 in a World Cup qualifier.

Personal life
Scannell and his wife Peggy had five children, one of whom, Tony, was an actor, best known for his role as Detective Sergeant Ted Roach in the television series The Bill. Tony left The Bill in 1993, the same year of his father's death, before a brief return in 2000. Tony died in May 2020. Another son of Scannell's, John, was a semi-professional goalkeeper, who played for Herne Bay and Whitstable Town.

References

External links
Post War English & Scottish Football League A - Z Player's Transfer Database profile

1925 births
Association footballers from County Cork
1993 deaths
Republic of Ireland association footballers
Southend United F.C. players
Republic of Ireland international footballers
English Football League players
Association football goalkeepers
Folkestone F.C. players
Tilbury F.C. players
People from Youghal